African immigrants in Europe are individuals residing in Europe who were born in Africa, this includes both individuals born in North Africa and Sub-Saharan Africa.

History
The Roman Emperor Septimius Severus was born in Leptis Magna in North Africa, in what is now modern-day Tripolitania, Libya. Some North Africans moved to Britain during Roman rule.

Six White British men with the same very rare surname have been found to have a Y-chromosome haplogroup originating from a Sub-Saharan African male, likely dating to the 16th century or later.

Migration flows

Since the 1960s, the main source countries of migration from Africa to Europe have been Morocco, Algeria, Tunisia and to a lesser extent, Egypt. This has resulted in large diasporas with origins in these countries by the end of the 20th century. In the period following the 1973 oil crisis, immigration controls in European states were tightened. The effect of this was not to reduce migration from North Africa but rather to encourage permanent settlement of previously temporary migrants and associated family migration. Much of this migration was from the Maghreb to France, the Netherlands, Belgium and Germany. From the second half of the 1980s, the destination countries for migrants from the Maghreb broadened to include Spain and Italy, as a result of increased demand for low-skilled labour in those countries.

Spain and Italy imposed visa requirements on migrants from the Maghreb in the early 1990s, and the result was an increase in illegal migration across the Mediterranean. Since 2000, the source countries of this illegal migration have grown to include sub-Saharan African states.

During 2000–2005, an estimated 440,000 people per year emigrated from Africa, most of them to Europe. According to Hein de Haas, the director of the International Migration Institute at the University of Oxford, public discourse on African migration to Europe portrays the phenomenon as an "exodus", largely composed of illegal migrants, driven by conflict and poverty. He criticises this portrayal, arguing that the illegal migrants are often well educated and able to afford the considerable cost of the journey to Europe. Migration from Africa to Europe, he argues, "is fuelled by a structural demand for cheap migrant labour in informal sectors". Most migrate on their own initiative, rather than being the victims of traffickers. Furthermore, he argues that whereas the media and popular perceptions see irregular migrants as mostly arriving by sea, most actually arrive on tourist visas or with false documentation, or enter via the Spanish enclaves, Ceuta and Melilla. He states that "the majority of irregular African migrants enter Europe legally and subsequently overstay their visas". Similarly, migration expert Stephen Castles argues that "Despite the media hysteria on the growth of African migration to Europe, actual numbers seem quite small – although there is a surprising lack of precision in the data".

According to the Organisation for Economic Co-operation and Development (OECD), migration from African countries to more developed states is small in comparison to overall migration worldwide. The BBC reported in 2007 that the International Organization for Migration estimates that around 4.6 million African migrants live in Europe, but that the Migration Policy Institute estimates that between 7 and 8 million illegal migrants from Africa live in the EU.

Illegal immigration

Illegal immigration from Africa to Europe is significant. Many people from underdeveloped African countries embark on the dangerous journey for Europe, in hopes of a better life. In parts of Africa, particularly North Africa (Morocco, Mauritania, and Libya), trafficking immigrants to Europe has become more lucrative than drug trafficking. Illegal immigration to Europe usually occurs by boat via the Mediterranean Sea, or in some cases by land at the Spanish Enclaves of Ceuta and Melilla, and has made international headlines. Many migrants risk serious injury or death during their journey to Europe and most of those whose claims for asylum were unsuccessful are deported back to Africa. Libya is the major departure point for illegal migrants setting off for Europe.

Between October 2013 and October 2014, the Italian government ran Operation Mare Nostrum, a naval and air operation intended to reduce illegal immigration to Europe and the incidence of migratory ship wreckages off the coast of Lampedusa. The Italian government ceased the operation as it was judged to be unsustainable, involving a large proportion of the Italian navy. The operation was replaced by a more limited joint EU border protection operation, named Operation Triton managed by the EU border agency, Frontex. Some other European governments, including Britain's, argued that the operations such as Mare Nostrum and Triton serve to provide an "unintended pull factor" encouraging further migration.

In 2014, 170,100 illegal migrants were recorded arriving in Italy by sea (an increase from 42,925 arrivals recorded in 2013), 141,484 of them leaving from Libya. Most of them came from Syria, the Horn of Africa and West Africa.

The issue returned to international headlines with a series of migrant shipwrecks, part of the 2015 Mediterranean migration crisis. The International Organization for Migration (IOM) estimates suggest that between the start of 2015 and the middle of April, 21,000 migrants had reached the Italian coast and 900 migrants had died in the Mediterranean. Critics of European policy towards illegal migration in the Mediterranean argue that the cancellation of Operation Mare Nostrum failed to deter migrants and that its replacement with Triton "created the conditions for the higher death toll".

Effects 
As far as the effects on source countries in Africa, an article in The Economist describes African migration as having some positive economic benefits for the African countries of origin (primarily from remittances, but also from showing "those at home the benefits of an education, encouraging more people to go to school").

As far as the impact on the destination countries in Europe, according to the BBC, there are rising numbers of crimes relating to African migration in Europe, specially Scandinavian countries, leading to opposition to immigration and the appearance of nationalist parties as the AfD, Sweden Democrats and Vox.

European immigration policies
The European Union does not have a common immigration policy regarding nationals of third countries. Some countries, such as Spain and Malta, have called for other EU member states to share the responsibility of dealing with migration flows from Africa. Spain has also created legal migration routes for African migrants, recruiting workers from countries including Senegal. Other states, such as France under the presidency of Nicolas Sarkozy, have adopted more restrictive policies, and tried to offer incentives for migrants to return to Africa. While adopting a more liberal approach than France, Spain has also, according to a Council on Foreign Relations report, "attempted to forge broad bilateral accords with African countries that would exchange repatriation for funding to help the returned migrants".

Spain has also run regularisation programmes in order to grant employment rights to previously irregular immigrants, most notably in 2005, but this has been the subject of criticism from other EU governments, which argue that it encourages further irregular migration and that regularised migrants are likely to move within the EU to richer states once they have status in Spain.

De Haas argues that restrictive European immigration policies have generally failed to reduce migration flows from Africa because they do not address the underlying structural demand for labour in European states. Dirk Kohnert argues that EU countries' policies on migration from Africa are focused mainly on security and the closing of borders. He is also skeptical that the EU's programmes that are designed to promote economic development in West Africa will result in reduced migration. Stephen Castles argues that there is a "sedentary bias" in developed states' migration policies towards Africa. He argues that "it has become the conventional wisdom to argue that promoting economic development in the Global South has the potential to reduce migration to the North. This carries the clear implication that such migration is a bad thing, and poor people should stay put". Julien Brachet argues that while "irregular migration from sub-Saharan Africa to Europe is very limited in absolute and relative numbers", "none" of the European migration policies implemented in northern and western Africa "has ever led to a real and sustainable decrease in the number of migrants" travelling towards Europe, but they have "directly fostered the clandestine transport of migrants".

Demographics

This table takes both North Africans and Sub-Saharan Africans into account, most numbers also only account for those born in the continent, for numbers of purely Sub-Saharan Africans or Black People, and their descendants of either full or mixed-race, refer to the page Afro-European.

Statistics

The rate of immigration is projected to continue to increase in the coming decades, according to Sir Paul Collier, a development economist.

Asylum applicants in Europe
Note: Asylum applicants to Europe are first-time applicants after the removal of withdrawn applications. Sub Saharan African migrant may enter each destination by other than the means displayed in this chart. Consequently, these flow figures are incomplete and likely represent minimums. Increases in migrant stocks and inflows are not the same. Source: Pew Research Center.

Origin countries of sub-Saharan migrants living in Europe
Top countries of birth of sub-Saharan migrants living in the European Union, Norway and Switzerland in 2017. Source: Pew Research Center.

Notable individuals

Acting and the Arts
Yemi Ajibade
Sokari Douglas Camp
Tuğçe Güder
Cabral Ibacka
Hugh Quarshie
Ashley Walters

Business
Ismail Ahmed
Mo Ibrahim
Mohamed Al-Fayed

Historical
Prince Alemayehu
Michele Amatore
Sara Forbes Bonetta
Ottobah Cugoano
Olaudah Equiano
Abram Petrovich Gannibal
August Agbola O'Browne
Angelo Soliman
Ignatius Sancho
Septimius Severus

Literature
Hakim Adi
Toyin Agbetu
Yemi Ajibade
Yaba Badoe
Simi Bedford
Margaret Busby
Ottobah Cugoano
Assia Djebar
Obi Egbuna
Inua Ellams
Buchi Emecheta
Olaudah Equiano
Yasmina Khadra
Nadifa Mohamed
Ben Okri
Warsan Shire

Medicine
Bernard Ribeiro, Baron Ribeiro
Magdi Yacoub

Music
Taio Cruz
Aar Maanta
Sade
Stromae
Tinchy Stryder
KSIOlajidebt

Politics
Ayaan Hirsi Ali
Magdi Allam
John Godson
Peter Hain
Abdi Yusuf Hassan
Hanan Ibrahim
Cécile Kyenge
Mohamed Abdullahi Omaar
Nyamko Sabuni
Mattias Tesfaye
Najat Vallaud-Belkacem
Rama Yade

Sports
Elvan Abeylegesse 
Abeba Aregawi
Polat Kemboi Arıkan
Gerald Asamoah
Alemitu Bekele Degfa
Jérôme Boateng
Derek Chisora
Didier Drogba
Eusébio 
Samuel Eto'o 
Mo Farah
Sifan Hassan
Serge Ibaka
Steve Mandanda
Francis Ngannou
Vahap Özaltay
Miriam Sylla
Samuel Umtiti
Paul Pogba 
Romelu Lukaku 
Kylian Mbappé

See also
 Emigration from Africa
 African Australians
 African New Zealanders
 African immigration to the United States
 African immigration to Canada
 African immigration to Latin America
 Black Europeans of African ancestry
 Migrants' African routes
 Threats facing illegal immigrants

References

Further reading

 Borst, Julia, and Danae Gallo González. "Narrative Constructions of Online Imagined Afro-diasporic Communities in Spain and Portugal." Open Cultural Studies 3.1 (2019): 286-307 online
 Cabre, Yolanda Aixela. "Equatorial Guinean Women's Roles after Migration to Spain: Conflicts between Women's Androcentric Socialization in Equatorial Guinea and Their Experiences after Migration." Urban anthropology and studies of cultural systems and world economic development (2013): 1-55 online.

 Deventer, Allison Crumly, and Dominic Thomas. "Afro‐European Studies: Emerging Fields and New Directions." in A companion to comparative literature (2011): 333-356.

 Maguire, Richard. Africans in East Anglia, 1467-1833 (Boydell Press, 2021), in England;online review 

 
online review

 Thomas, Dominic. "Introduction: racial advocacy in France." French Cultural Studies 24.2 (2013): 149-160.

 Thomas, Dominic. "Afropeanism and Francophone sub-saharan African writing." in Francophone Afropean Literatures, (Liverpool University Press, 2014) pp: 17-31.

 Ugarte, Michael. Africans in Europe: The culture of exile and emigration from Equatorial Guinea to Spain (University of Illinois Press, 2010). online

 White, Elisa Joy. "Beyond emergent: Creating, debating, and implementing African European studies." in Locating African European Studies ( Routledge, 2019) Pp. 311-326.

 
Immigration to Europe